Stefan Kiraj (born 11 May 1989) is a German canoeist. He competed in the men's C-1 200 metres event at the 2016 Summer Olympics where he finished 6th in his semifinal and did not advance.

References

External links
 
 
 

1989 births
Living people
People from Spremberg
People from Bezirk Cottbus
German male canoeists
Sportspeople from Brandenburg
Olympic canoeists of Germany
Canoeists at the 2016 Summer Olympics
ICF Canoe Sprint World Championships medalists in Canadian
Canoeists at the 2015 European Games
European Games competitors for Germany